Henry Cheyne, 1st Baron Cheyne (31 May 1540 – 3 September 1587) was an English politician.

Henry Cheyne was the son of Sir Thomas Cheyne of Shurland in the Isle of Sheppey, Kent, by his second wife, Anne Broughton (d. 16 May 1562), daughter of John Broughton (d. 24 January 1518) of Toddington, Bedfordshire, and Anne Sapcote (d. 14 March 1559), and granddaughter of Sir Robert Broughton by his first wife, Katherine de Vere, said to have been the illegitimate daughter of John de Vere, 13th Earl of Oxford.

Cheyne was trained in the law at Gray's Inn. He inherited his father's estates in Kent in 1558, and his mother's estates in Bedfordshire in 1562. He was knighted in 1563.

He was elected knight of the shire (MP) for Kent from 1562 to 1567 and for Bedfordshire from 1572 until made Baron Cheyne in May 1572. He was appointed High Sheriff of Bedfordshire and Buckinghamshire for 1565.

He held the title Baron Cheyne from 1572 until his death in 1587, after which the title became extinct. He had married Jane, the daughter of Thomas Wentworth, 1st Baron Wentworth, with whom he had a daughter. He was buried at Toddington.

References

Sources

1540 births
1587 deaths
Barons in the Peerage of England
High Sheriffs of Bedfordshire
High Sheriffs of Buckinghamshire
English MPs 1563–1567
English MPs 1572–1583
16th-century English nobility
People from Toddington, Bedfordshire
Burials in Bedfordshire